Sir Clement Raphael Freud (24 April 1924 – 15 April 2009) was a German-born British broadcaster, writer, politician and chef.

The son of Ernst L. Freud and grandson of Sigmund Freud, Clement moved to the United Kingdom from Nazi Germany as a child and later worked as a prominent chef and food writer. He became known to a wider audience as a television and radio personality. Freud was the longest serving panellist on the BBC Radio 4 panel show Just a Minute, appearing in each of the first 143 episodes, and making subsequent regular appearances up until his death in 2009. He was elected as a Liberal Member of Parliament in 1973, retaining his seat until 1987, when he received a knighthood.

In 2016, seven years after his death, three women made public allegations of child sexual abuse and rape by Freud, which led to police investigations.

Early life 
Clement Freud was born Clemens Rafael Freud in Berlin, the son of Jewish parents Ernst L. Freud (an architect) and Lucie Freud (née Brasch). He was a grandson of psychoanalyst Sigmund Freud and the brother of artist Lucian Freud. His family fled to the United Kingdom from Nazi Germany and his forenames were anglicised to Clement Raphael. He spent his later childhood in Hampstead, where he attended the Hall School, a prep school. He was then educated at two independent schools: at Dartington Hall School, where he boarded, and at St Paul's School in London. He was naturalised as a British subject on 4 September 1939, one day after the outbreak of the Second World War.

During the war Freud joined the Royal Ulster Rifles and served in the ranks, acting as an aide to Field Marshal Montgomery. He later worked at the Nuremberg Trials and in 1947 was commissioned as an officer. Freud married June Flewett (the inspiration for Lucy Pevensie in C. S. Lewis's children's series The Chronicles of Narnia) in 1950, and the couple had five children. Flewett had taken the stage name Jill Raymond in 1944, and after her husband's knighthood has been known as Lady Freud. Freud became an Anglican at the time of his marriage.

Early career 
Freud was one of Britain's first celebrity chefs. He worked at the Dorchester Hotel and went on to run his own restaurant in Sloane Square at a relatively young age. Freud appeared in a series of dog food advertisements (at first Chunky Meat, later Chunky Minced Morsels) in which he co-starred with a bloodhound called Henry (played by a number of dogs) which shared his trademark "hangdog" expression. In 1964 he appeared in Strictly for the Birds. In 1968 he wrote the children's book Grimble, followed by a sequel, Grimble at Christmas, six years later.

Whilst running a nightclub, Freud met a newspaper editor who gave him a job as a sports journalist. From there he became an award-winning food and drink writer, writing columns for many publications.

Political career 
Freud stood in the 1973 Isle of Ely by-election, becoming the Liberal Member of Parliament for that constituency (later North East Cambridgeshire) from 1973 to 1987. In 1983, to support employment in his constituency, he assisted the management buy-out of a concrete pipe manufacturer in March, Cambridgeshire, led by Tom Moore, and became an investor in the resulting March Concrete Ltd. His departure from Parliament was marked by the award of a knighthood.

In his column in the Racing Post of 23 August 2006, Freud wrote about his election to Parliament in a by-election: "Politically, I was an anti-Conservative unable to join a Labour party hell-bent on nationalising everything that moved, so when a by-election occurred in East Anglia, where I lived and live, I stood as a Liberal and was fortunate in getting in. Ladbrokes quoted me at 33–1 in this three-horse contest, so Ladbrokes paid for me to have rather more secretarial and research staff than other MPs, which helped to keep me in for five parliaments."

His autobiography, Freud Ego, recalls his election win, and shortly after, when asked by his wife June, "Why aren't you looking happier?", he wrote, "It suddenly occurred to me that after nine years of fame I now had something solid about which to be famous... and cheered up no end." During his time as a Member of Parliament, he visited China with a delegation of MPs, including Winston Churchill, the grandson of the wartime prime minister. When Churchill was given the best room in the hotel, on account of his lineage, Freud (in a reference to his own famous forebear) declared it was the first time in his life that he had been "out-grandfathered".

Callaghan and freedom of information 
In the last year of Callaghan's government there was a proposal to revive the one-year Lib-Lab pact which had lapsed in July 1978, to include introducing a freedom of information act, long proposed by the Liberals; however, Callaghan himself was opposed to this kind of legislation. Towards the end of the five-year term there was a confidence vote in Callaghan's government, and Freud was expected to follow his party and vote with the Opposition. Due to by-election defeats Labour's Callaghan ran a minority government and sought support of members from opposing parties to support him that day; to that end Freud, in Liverpool at the time, received a phone call from 10 Downing Street at 3pm asking him to miss his train back to London for the 10pm vote, in exchange for a "looser" version of his proposed freedom of information act being enacted. Freud declined the offer and voted as stated by his party, after the lapse of the Lib-Lab pact, for an immediate general election. Otherwise the government could have continued until October 1979.

Radio, music and academia 

For many, Freud was best known as a panellist on the long-running Radio 4 show Just a Minute. Freud performed a small monologue for the Wings 1973 album Band on the Run and appeared on the album's cover. He also made the occasional film appearance, with acting roles in movies such as The Mini-Affair (1967) and The Best House in London (1969).

In 1974, he was elected Rector of the University of Dundee and served two three-year terms. A generation later, in 2002, he was elected Rector of the University of St Andrews, beating feminist and academic Germaine Greer and local challenger Barry Joss, holding the position for one term.

Family and hobbies 
His son Matthew Freud founded the London public relations firm Freud Communications in 1985. He was formerly married to Caroline Hutton, who was the second wife of Earl Spencer; he then married media magnate Rupert Murdoch's daughter Elisabeth.

Freud's daughter Emma Freud, a broadcaster, is the partner of Richard Curtis, scriptwriter of Blackadder and Four Weddings and a Funeral. His nieces (by his painter brother Lucian) include poet Annie Freud fashion designer Bella Freud and writer Esther Freud. His eldest brother, Stephen Freud, closely guarded his privacy, with the exception of a 2008 interview he gave to The Daily Telegraph. Stephen died in 2015, at the age of 93. Freud died without resolving a feud with his brother Lucian, thought to have dated back 70 years, over which of them was the rightful winner of a boyhood race. There have been claims that Freud fathered a child in the mid-1950s with the family's 17-year-old nanny.

Freud was a columnist for the Racing Post newspaper. Freud's enthusiasm for horse racing went as far as challenging Sir Hugh Fraser, then chairman of Harrods, to a horse race at Haydock in 1972. Freud trained for three months and lost some five stone for the event. Although Fraser, a country gentleman, was seen as a much better prospect, the two made a bet for £1,000-a-side. Freud used the long odds to his advantage, however, and shrewdly placed a large side bet on himself. Freud won the race and made a great deal of money. His horse, Winter Fair, went on to win the Waterloo Hurdle at Aintree that same year.

Freud also wrote articles reviewing facilities for spectators at racecourses in Britain, especially catering. This led him to receive the nickname "Sir Clement Food".

Death and funeral 
Freud died at his home on 15 April 2009, nine days before his 85th birthday. His funeral service was held at St Bride's Church in Fleet Street and was attended by a host of personalities from the media and entertainment industry including Bono, Richard Curtis, Stephen Fry, Paul Merton, Debbie McGee, and Nicholas Parsons as well as several representatives from Westminster, such as then-Prime Minister Gordon Brown, then-Shadow Chancellor George Osborne and former Liberal party leader Lord Steel. He was survived by his wife of 59 years, Jill Freud, his five children, his 17 grandchildren and his two elder brothers, Stephen and Lucian.

Child sexual abuse allegations
On 15 June 2016, allegations were made in Exposure: Abused and Betrayed – A Life Sentence, an ITV documentary, that Freud had engaged in child sexual abuse between the 1940s and the 1970s. Two women, who did not know each other, spoke publicly for the first time about how Freud preyed upon them when they were still children and into young adulthood. Sylvia Woosley contacted the ITV News team – the same team that exposed Jimmy Savile – to tell them she had been abused for many years by Freud, from the age of 10 in the 1950s to when she left his home aged 19. The second woman, who remained anonymous, said that Freud groomed her from the age of 11 in 1971, abused her at 14, and violently raped her at 18, by which time Freud had become a Liberal MP.

On the day of the documentary broadcast, Freud's widow, Jill Freud, issued an apology to both women. She accepted the claims and issued a statement of sympathy for his victims, saying: "I sincerely hope they will now have some peace."

A third woman, Vicky Hayes, has alleged that she was assaulted and raped by Freud when she was aged 17. Hayes said Freud had no right to his reputation as a "pillar of society" and ought to be posthumously stripped of his knighthood. It also emerged that Operation Yewtree had been passed Freud's name in 2012 when two alleged victims made accusations to the National Society for the Prevention of Cruelty to Children (NSPCC).

Allegations have also been made of predatory behaviour towards female students during Freud's time as Rector of the University of Dundee in the 1970s. Craig Murray, a former British ambassador, who was a student at Dundee University in the late 1970s, described an incident when Freud asked the president of the students' union to pimp for him and select a woman to entertain him.

Bibliography 

 1968 – Grimble – illustrated by Quentin Blake
 1973 – Grimble at Christmas – illustrated by Quentin Blake
 1978 – Freud on Food
 1980 – Clicking Vicky
 1981 – The Book of Hangovers – 1982 paperback version illustrated by Bill Tidy
 1983 – Below the Belt
 1988 – No one Else Has Complained
 1989 – The Gourmet's Tour of Great Britain and Ireland
 2001 – Freud Ego
 2009 – Freud on Course – The Racing Lives of Clement Freud

See also 
 Freud family

References

Further reading 
 Crewe, Daniel. "One of Nature’s Liberals: the career of Sir Clement Freud, artist, journalist, chef, bon-viveur – and Liberal MP, 1973–87" in Journal of Liberal History, Issue 43, Summer 2004.

External links 
 
 Video: Sir Clement Freud dies aged 84 – Times Online
 New York Times obituary
 Sir Clement Freud dies aged 84 – guardian.co.uk
 AP Obituary in The Times
 Gallery of pictures at guardian.co.uk
 
 

|-

|-

|-

 

1924 births
2009 deaths
People educated at Dartington Hall School
British Army General List officers
British Army personnel of World War II
Child sexual abuse in the United Kingdom
Converts to Anglicanism from Judaism
British Anglicans
British broadcaster-politicians
British chefs
British people of Austrian-Jewish descent
Clement
German people of Austrian-Jewish descent
Jewish British politicians
Jewish emigrants from Nazi Germany to the United Kingdom
Knights Bachelor
Liberal Party (UK) MPs for English constituencies
People educated at St Paul's School, London
People educated at The Hall School, Hampstead
People from Berlin
Rectors of the University of Dundee
Rectors of the University of St Andrews
Royal Ulster Rifles soldiers
UK MPs 1970–1974
UK MPs 1974
UK MPs 1974–1979
UK MPs 1979–1983
UK MPs 1983–1987
Naturalised citizens of the United Kingdom